Rupantharana is a 2014 Sri Lankan Sinhala action thriller film directed by Nalaka Withange and produced by Arosha Fernando. It stars newcomers Amila Karunanayake and Shaila Nathaniel in lead roles along with stars like Ranjan Ramanayake, Ravindra Randeniya and Tissa Wijesurendra. It is the 1201st Sri Lankan film in the Sinhala cinema.

Plot

Cast
 Amila Karunanayake as Haren
 Shaila Nathaniel as Andrea
 Ravindra Randeniya as Brigadier Vimal
 Ranjan Ramanayake as Lieutenant Gajasinghe aka Moorthi
 Anjela Seneviratne as Saroja
 Tissa Wijesurendra as Gilbert
 Damitha Abeyratne as Radha
 Saranga Disasekara as Captain Suraweera
 Menik Wijewarndena in cameo appearance 
 Milinda Madugalle as Warun
 Kelum Kularathne
 Nayana Kumari as Haren's boss

Soundtrack

References

2014 films
2010s Sinhala-language films